Okey Dokey, Okie Dokie, or Oki Doki may refer to:
Okie Dokie It's The Orb on Kompakt, an album by the Orb
"Okey Dokey" (SKE48 song)
"Okey Dokey", a song by Zico and Song Min-ho
"Oki doki", a song from Lithuania in the Junior Eurovision Song Contest 2010
Oki Doki, a fictional planet in Q Pootle 5
Oki Doki, a character in the Pee-Wee's Playhouse episode "Accidental Playhouse"

See also
Oakie Doke, a children's television programme